The 2006 Women's Asia Cup was the third Asian Cricket Council Women's Asia Cup. The three teams which took part in the women's One Day International tournament were India, Pakistan and Sri Lanka. It was held between 13 and 21 December 2006 in India. All the matches of the tournament were played at the Sawai Mansingh Stadium in Jaipur. The tournament was won by India, defeating Sri Lanka by eight wickets in the final.

Squads

Match summary

Final

References

External links
 Cricinfo tournament page

2006
2006 in Indian cricket
2006 in Sri Lankan cricket
2006 in Pakistani cricket
International women's cricket competitions in India
2006 in women's cricket
International cricket competitions in 2006–07
December 2006 sports events in Asia